The ABC Champions Cup 2000 was the 11th staging of the ABC Champions Cup, the basketball club tournament of Asian Basketball Confederation. The tournament was held in Beirut, Lebanon between May 14 to 21, 2000. The reigning champions Sagesse from the hosts were the first team to successfully defend their title in this annual tournament.

Preliminary round

Group A

Group B

Knockout round

Semifinals

Finals

Final standings

Awards
Most Valuable Player:  Elie Mechantaf (Sagesse)
Most Valuable Coach:  Ghassan Sarkis (Sagesse)
Best Rebounder:  Assane N'Diaye (Sagesse)
Best Three Point Shooter:  Sherell Ford (Al-Ittihad)
Best Defender:  Mohammad Acha (Sagesse)
Best Scorer:  Sherell Ford (Sagesse)
Best Sixth Man:  Bader Makki (Sagesse)
Best Sportsmanship:  Assane N'Diaye (Sagesse)
Fair Play:  Al-Manama

References
www.asianbasketball.com
www.sagessefan.com

2000
Champions Cup
B
Basketball Asia Champions Cup 2000